Erica Wagner (born 1963) is an Australian artist, editor and publisher.

Life

Solo exhibitions

2018 Little Wings, No Vacancy Federation Square, Melbourne
2016 Sanctuary, No Vacancy Federation Square, Melbourne 
2012 Retreat, Decoy Cafe, Melbourne
2011 Dark Horse, Cambridge Studio Gallery, Collingwood

Awards
2020 Winner: Australian Book Industry Awards' Pixie O’Harris award for outstanding commitment to children's literature
2017 Highly Commended: Victorian Artists Society Spring Exhibition (Tarra River, Waiting for the Platypus)
2017 VAS George Hicks Foundation Contemporary Art Prize
2017 Dromkeen Medal
2016 Highly Commended: Victorian Artists Society Winter Exhibition (Hattah Lakes)
2014 Camberwell Art Show: Deans Encouragement Award, Acrylic Prize (Lagoon)
2013 Highly Commended: St Kevin's College Art Show (Walk on By)
2012 Highly Commended: St Kevin's College Art Show (Mt Sonder)
2011 Winner: Contemporary Art Society of Victoria Annual Exhibition (Telling You the Story of My Life)
2011 Highly Commended: Contemporary Art Society of Victoria Annual Exhibition (Fay, One Autumn Day)
2011 Highly Commended: Victorian Artists Society Winter Exhibition (Mermaid Nude)
2009 Winner: Best Abstract/Contemporary, Pastel Society of Victoria (Angel)
2005 Winner: Best Non Traditional/Other, Pastel Society of Victoria (Moving Figure, Dance)
2005 Winner: Victorian Artists Society Winter Exhibition (Moving Figure, Battleground)

References

External links 

about Erica Wagner
The Pastel Society of Victoria, Australia Inc.
Contemporary Art Society of Victoria
St Kevin's College Art Show
Camberwell Art Show

1963 births
Living people
21st-century Australian artists
21st-century Australian women artists